Jasper is an opaque mineral.

Jasper or Jaspers may also refer to:

Computing 
 JasPer, a project to create an open-source implementation of the JPEG-2000 codec 
 Tomcat Jasper, a software engine used by Apache Tomcat for JavaServer Pages
Jasper, a hardware revision of Microsoft's Xbox 360 video game console
 Jasper Technologies, Inc., an American corporation that provides a cloud-based software platform for the Internet of Things
 Jasper Design Automation, an electronic design automation company, now part of Cadence Design Systems
 JasperReports, an open source Java reporting library

Music
 "Jasper", a 1976 Jim Stafford song
 "Jasper" (Kaela Kimura song), a 2008 song

People and fictional characters 
 Jasper (given name)
 Jasper (surname)

Places

Australia 
 Lake Jasper, a permanent freshwater lake in Western Australia

Canada 
 Jasper National Park
 Jasper, Alberta, a specialized municipality
 Jasper station, a Canadian National Railway station

United States 
 Jasper, Alabama, a city
 Jasper, Arkansas, a city
 Jasper, Florida, a city
 Jasper, Georgia, a city
 Jasper, Indiana, a city
 Jasper, Minnesota, a city
 Jasper, Missouri, a city
 Jasper, New York, a town
 Jasper, Ohio, an unincorporated community
 Jasper, Oregon, an unincorporated community
 Jasper, Tennessee, a town
 Jasper, Texas, a city
 Jasper, Virginia, an unincorporated community
 Jasper County, includes a list of U.S. counties with that name
 Jasper Creek (disambiguation)
 Jasper Township (disambiguation)

Other uses 
 , six ships of the Royal Navy
 Jasper High School (disambiguation), various American schools
 Jasper (San Francisco), a residential skyscraper
 Jasper ware, a type of fine pottery developed by Josiah Wedgwood
 Joint Actinide Shock Physics Experimental Research
 Jasper United, a Nigerian former football club based in the city of Onitsha
 A colloquial name for the common wasp in southern England and the English Midlands
 Jasper Ocean Terminal, a planned deepwater container port in South Carolina
 Manhattan Jaspers and Lady Jaspers, the nicknames of the Manhattan College sports teams
 Jasper (film), a 2022 Indian Tamil-language drama film

See also 
 Jaspers (disambiguation)